The Springe is a short river in Baden-Württemberg, Germany. It flows to the Schmiech at Allmendingen.

See also
List of rivers of Baden-Württemberg

Rivers of Baden-Württemberg
Rivers of Germany